Dino Turcato (born 27 July 1946) is an Italian weightlifter. He competed in the men's light heavyweight event at the 1972 Summer Olympics.

References

1946 births
Living people
Italian male weightlifters
Olympic weightlifters of Italy
Weightlifters at the 1972 Summer Olympics
Place of birth missing (living people)
20th-century Italian people